Sidi Abderrahmane may refer to:

 Sidi Abderrahmane, Chlef, a town and commune in Algeria
 Sidi Abderrahmane, Tiaret, a town and commune in Algeria
 Sidi Abder Rahman El Thaelebi (1384–1479), Algerian Muslim scholar